was a Japanese literary critic and a professor of Russian literature at Waseda University. He is also known as Tengen Katagami (片上天絃; later 片上天弦).

Biography
Katagami was born in Ehime, Japan, and graduated Waseda University in 1906, majoring English literature. He supported naturalism as an editor of a journal Waseda bungaku. He became a professor at Waseda University in 1910, but later he became interested in Russian literature and traveled to Russia to study Russian literature (1915-1918). In 1920, when Waseda University created a department of Russian literature, Katagami was appointed as the chief professor. 

Masuji Ibuse, who was one of his students at that time, was harassed sexually by Katagami, so he had to leave the university before graduation (1921).

Katagami's literature theory became the basis of proletarian literature in Japan.

1884 births
1928 deaths
Japanese writers
Slavists
Waseda University alumni